The Dassault Falcon 6X is a large, long-range business jet under development by Dassault Aviation in France.
Its precursor, the Falcon 5X twinjet, was launched in 2013, rolled-out in 2015 and made its first flight on July 5, 2017, but its development was frozen as its Safran Silvercrest engine failed to meet performance objectives.
In December 2017, the Falcon 6X was launched as a stretched version with PW812D turbofans, made its first flight on 10 March 2021, and is slated to enter service in mid-2023.

Its  wing allows a  maximum weight with  engines, for a  range and a Mach 0.90 top speed.

Development

Falcon 5X 

Design work began in 2006 under the codename SMS for super-midsize, and was envisioned to compete with the Hawker 4000, the Bombardier Challenger 300 and the Gulfstream G200 or the Embraer Legacy 600 with a  range. Few details were publicized, except that the model was to be powered by two 10,000-pound-thrust Rolls-Royce RB282 engines.

The project was revamped after the 2008 recession when demand for super midsized and smaller aircraft decreased dramatically, while demand for the large-cabin, long-range models remained vigorous. In 2009, the design was re-evaluated and the engine choice was reassessed.

The 5X was unveiled at the National Business Aviation Association's annual convention on October 21, 2013, to be powered by two Snecma Silvercrests.
Compliant Silvercrest engines were originally planned for the end of 2013 but technical issues led Safran to postpone them to the end of 2017, leading to delay the 5X introduction from 2017 to 2020, and the high pressure compressor issues in the fall of 2017 delayed it further with performance shortfalls, preventing a 2020 service entry.

On 29 January 2016, Dassault Aviation confirmed a two-year delay and production freeze on the Falcon 5X because of ongoing problems with the Snecma Silvercrest engine, the same engine responsible for delaying the development of the Citation Hemisphere.
As Dassault endured a near three-year delay to 2020 with 12 cancellations in 2016, it demanded compensation from Safran for the engine delays.

After ground tests in spring 2017 including low and high speed taxi, the 5X made its first flight from Bordeaux–Mérignac Airport with a preliminary version of the engines on July 5, 2017.
The preliminary flight tests were intended to  streamline the development program, leading to full flight testing in 2018. That program was planned to fly with certifiable engines for flight validation and type certification, "limiting the consequences of the four year engine development delay as much as possible".
It was then scheduled to enter service in 2020.

By October 2017, the prototype had completed 50 flight hours, testing system performance and basic handling qualities.
Dassault then  announced the aircraft's service introduction could be further delayed after Safran discovered high-pressure compressor response problems at high altitudes and low airspeeds on its flying testbed in San Antonio. Dassault did not rule out switching its engine supplier at that point.
The prototype reached Mach 0.8 and 41,000 ft.

Falcon 6X

On 13 December 2017, Dassault abandoned the Silvercrest due to technical and schedule risks, ending the 5X development. In its place the company launched a new Falcon model with the same fuselage cross section, Pratt & Whitney Canada engines and a  range, planned for a 2022 introduction.
The new jet will use Pratt & Whitney Canada PW800s, already powering the Gulfstream G500/G600.

The design was unveiled in February 2018, is forecast to make its first flight in early 2021 and begin deliveries in 2022.
Dassault hopes to launch a larger and longer-range variant of the 6X, to compete with the 7,700 nm (14,300 km)-range Bombardier Global 7500 and the 7,500 nm-range Gulfstream G650ER.
On 6 September 2018, Dassault Aviation and Safran ended their dispute with US$ 280 million in compensatory damages paid by Safran to Dassault.
By October 2018, Dassault had started construction of the lower wing and rear fuselage parts.

By February 2019, the 6X's PW812D engines had accumulated 120 hours of flight tests.
By May 2019, the design was frozen, the engines had 1,000 h of test time, and assembly was expected in 2020 for an on-track program.
By October 2019, the first aircraft's front, main and rear fuselage sections were completed before being assembled and joined with the wing in early 2020.

The Falcon 6X was rolled-out on 8 December 2020. The initial flight was on 10 March 2021.
On 30 November 2021, a type certificate was issued by Transport Canada for the PW812 engine.
It came after more than 4,900 hours of testing and will allow the 6X to enter service on schedule in late 2022.

By March 2022, Dassault had completed cold weather testing in Iqaluit, Canada, reaching -37 °C (-35 °F), towards certification expected later in 2022 as the test fleet had accumulated 650 flight hours across 220 sorties.
By May 2022, as the three test  aircraft have logged 850 hours, service entry was pushed to mid-2023 due to the supply chain crisis following Covid-19 and the war in Ukraine.
In 2022, its equipped price was $52.75M.

Design

The Falcon 6X is largely based on the Falcon 5X aerodynamics and systems, validated during its preliminary flight test program, but it is optimized to take advantage of its  PW812D engines for a longer cabin and a greater  range, a Mach 0.90 top speed and a Mach 0.85 cruise.

A front-fuselage extension makes its cabin  longer.
The Falcon 6X reinforces the 5X new  wing and keeps its digital flight control system and Honeywell Primus Epic EASy III flight deck.
The Falcon 6X will be the first Dassault aircraft with a nitrogen inerting system.

Specifications

See also

Notes

References

External links
 

Falcon 6X
Proposed aircraft of France
Low-wing aircraft
Twinjets
Cruciform tail aircraft
Aircraft first flown in 2021